Galinsoga durangensis is a rare Mexican species of flowering plant in the family Asteraceae. It has been found in the States of Durango and Sinaloa in northwestern Mexico.

Description
Each head has 8-13 ray flowers surrounding about 30-65 disc flowers.

References

durangensis
Flora of Northwestern Mexico
Plants described in 1975